Aizoon canariense is a species of small leafy annual plant in the family Aizoaceae.

Description
The plant can grow up to 25 cm height. Its branches spread on the ground, its leaves are petiolate, somewhat fleshy and hairy. It has small flowers with 1–3 mm long sepals, yellowish inside, and no petals.

Distribution
The plant A. canariense can be found in warm arid to semi-arid areas including Macaronesia (on Madeira, Canary Islands and Cape Verde), Arabia, Pakistan, North Africa and Southern Africa.

References

External links

Aizoon canariense at Flora of the Canary Islands

Aizoaceae
Flora of Algeria
Flora of the Canary Islands
Flora of Madeira
Flora of Morocco
Plants described in 1753
Taxa named by Carl Linnaeus